Tarps Elin is a 1956 Swedish drama film directed by Kenne Fant.

Cast
 Eva Dahlbeck as Elin Tarp
 Erik Strandmark as Tryggve Linde
 Ulf Palme as Kjell Loväng
 John Norrman as Tarp, Elin's Father
 Holger Löwenadler as Arvid Loväng
 Märta Arbin as Inga Loväng
 Carl Deurell as Botvid
 Wiktor Andersson as Beck-Lasse (as Viktor Andersson)
 Ragnar Falck as Håkansson (as Ragnar Falk)
 Hans Strååt as Vicar
 Bengt Eklund as Sixten
 Olof Widgren as Doctor

References

External links
 

1956 films
1956 drama films
Swedish drama films
1950s Swedish-language films
Films directed by Kenne Fant
1950s Swedish films
Swedish black-and-white films